Bickerton is a civil parish in Cheshire East, England.  It contains four buildings that are recorded in the National Heritage List for England as designated listed buildings, all of which are at Grade II.  This grade is the lowest of the three gradings given to listed buildings and is applied to "buildings of national importance and special interest".  Apart from the village of Bickerton, the parish is entirely rural.  The listed buildings consist of a timber-framed barn, the chimney of the engine house of a closed copper mine, a war memorial, and a church.

References
Citations

Sources

Listed buildings in the Borough of Cheshire East
Lists of listed buildings in Cheshire